Sadr al-Shari'a al-Asghar, also known as Sadr al-Shari'a al-Thani, was a Hanafi-Maturidi scholar, faqih (jurist), mutakallim (theologian), mufassir (Qur'anic exegete), muhaddith (expert of the Hadith), nahawi (grammarian), lughawi (linguist), logician, and astronomer, known for both his theories of time and place and his commentary on Islamic jurisprudence, indicating the depth of his knowledge in various Islamic disciplines.

His lineage reaches 'Ubadah ibn al-Samit. He was praised by al-Taftazani, and 'Abd al-Hayy al-Lucknawi.

Name 
He is 'Ubayd-Allah b. Mas'ud b. Mahmud b. Ahmad b. 'Ubayd-Allah al-Mahbubi al-Bukhari.

He is also called Sadr al-Shari'a al-Asghar. Generally, when Sadr al-Shari'a is said, it refers to him. The term al-Asghar or al-Thani is sometimes added after his title to differentiate him from his great grandfather Ahmad b. 'Ubayd-Allah who is also known as Sadr al-Shari'a but with the suffix of al-Akbar or al-Awwal.

Birth 
His date of birth is not recorded in the well-known bio-dictionaries.

Teachers 
He was born into a family with a long line of scholars. He studied under his father as well as his grandfather.

Works 
His expertise expanded to many fields including Hadith, Fiqh, Usul al-Fiqh, kalam (theology), logic, grammar, rhetoric, exact and natural sciences. His knowledge was vast and incisive through which he was able to summarise many important and difficult topics succinctly.

He authored of a number of influential works in the Hanafi madhhab. His al-Tanqih, along with his own commentary upon it entitled al-Tawdih, is a work of usul al-fiqh that merges between 'the way of the jurists' (i.e. the Hanafis) and between 'the way of the scholastics', combining and reorganising the works of the Hanafi Fakhr al-Islam al-Bazdawi and the Maliki Ibn al-Hajib into a new synthesis. This work reflects a new development in the scholasticization of Hanafi jurisprudential theory.

He authored a work (yet unpublished) known under the title Ta'dil al-'Ulum, which became a milestone in the development of the Maturidi kalam in Khorasan and Ma Wara' al-Nahr (Transoxania).

His Ta'dil al-'Ulum was recommended by the sixteenth-century Ottoman scholar and judge Ahmed Taşköprüzade (d. 1561) to anyone desirous of reaching the highest degree of excellence in logic.

Astronomy 
Sadr's astronomical work represents an ongoing revision of Ptolemaic astronomy. In that context, he undertook to correct the works of two of his predecessors, namely Nasir al-Din al-Tusi and Qutb al-Din al-Shirazi. The models of the last two were developed in their two respective works, the Tadhkira and the Tuhfa. Sadr took it upon himself to solve the problems they did not tackle, and to supply answers to the subtleties they did not address.

Sadr's astronomical writings are found in the third volume of his three‐volume encyclopedia of the sciences, the Ta'dil al-'Ulum (The Adjustment of the Sciences). The first two volumes dealt with logic and kalam. The third volume was called Kitab Ta'dil Hay'at al-Aflak (The Adjustment of the Configuration of the Celestial Spheres).

This encyclopaedia starts with logic, proceeds through theology, and ends with astronomy. It was written in Bukhara, and was finished shortly before the death of its author.

This work of Sadr is written in the traditional form of a commentary, where he gives his own text and then comments on the same. As is usual in such commentaries, the text is separated from the comments by the classical notation: a sentence preceded by the Arabic mim (short for matn) refers to the text, whereas the latter shin (for sharh) introduces the comment to that specific text. As a result, the work became voluminous, reaching some seventy densely written folios.

Death 
He died on 747 AH (1346–47 CE) and was buried in Bukhara.

See also 
 Shams al-Din al-Samarqandi
 Ulugh Beg
 Al-Biruni
 Ali Qushji
 Fakhr al-Din al-Razi
 Cosmology in medieval Islam
 
 List of scientists in medieval Islamic world
 List of Hanafis
 List of Muslim theologians
 List of Ash'aris and Maturidis

Notes

References

Further reading

Arabic sources 
 Mu'jam al-Mu'allifin by Umar Rida Kahhalah.
 Hadiyyat al-'Arifin by Isma'il Pasha al-Babani al-Baghdadi.
 Al-'Alam by Khayr al-Din al-Zirikli.
 Encyclopedia of Islamic Jurisprudence by the Kuwait Ministry of Awqaf and Islamic Affairs.
 كتاب: معجم الأصوليين - يحتوي على علماء أصول الفقه وأصحاب الآراء فيه والمؤلفين فيه، تأليف: أبي الطيب مولود السريري السوسي، الناشر: دار الكتب العلمية، ص: 330

External links 
 A Biography of Sadr al-Shari'a al-Thani — McGill University
 Sadr al-Shari'a al-Asghar (d. 747 AH)
 Two Glosses on Sadr al-Sharia's Prolegomena (Arabic)

Arabic 
 Sharh al-Wiqayah — World Digital Library 
 Sharh Mukhtasar al-Wiqayah — World Digital Library 
 The Logic in Ta'dil al-'Ulum (The Adjustment of the Sciences) 
 A Brief Biography of Sadr al-Shari'a 

Hanafis
Maturidis
14th-century Muslim theologians
Quranic exegesis scholars
Hadith scholars
Transoxanian Islamic scholars
Linguists
Natural scientists
People from Bukhara
Sunni imams
Sunni fiqh scholars
Sunni Muslim scholars of Islam
Uzbekistani Sunni Muslims
Uzbek logicians
Uzbek astronomers
Astronomers of the medieval Islamic world
14th-century astronomers
1346 deaths
1347 deaths